Air interdiction (AI), also known as deep air support (DAS), is the use of preventive tactical bombing and strafing by combat aircraft against enemy targets that are not an immediate threat, to delay, disrupt or hinder later enemy engagement of friendly forces. It is a core capability of virtually all military air forces, and has been conducted in conflicts since World War I.

A distinction is often made between tactical and strategic air interdiction, depending on the objectives of the operation. Typical objectives in tactical interdiction are meant to affect events rapidly and locally, for example through direct destruction of forces or supplies en route to the active battle area. By contrast, strategic objectives are often broader and more long-term, with fewer direct attacks on enemy fighting capabilities, instead focusing on infrastructure, logistics and other supportive assets.

The term deep air support relates to close air support and denotes the difference between their respective objectives. Close air support, as the name suggests, is directed towards targets close to friendly ground units, as closely coordinated air-strikes, in direct support of active engagement with the enemy. Deep air support or air interdiction is carried out further from the active fighting, based more on strategic planning and less directly coordinated with ground units. Despite being more strategic than close air support, air interdiction should not be confused with strategic bombing, which is unrelated to ground operations.

Background
In an examination of past air interdiction campaigns, Dr. Eduard Mark of the Center for Air Force History identified three methods by which an air interdiction campaign is carried out.  The first is by the physical destruction or attrition of soldiers and matériel before they can reach the battlefield.  The second is by severing the enemy's lines of communication, or creating blockage, to prevent soldiers and matériel from reaching the battlefield.  The third is to create systemic inefficiencies in the enemy's logistic system so that soldiers and matériel arrive to the battlefield more slowly or in an uneconomical manner.

While all three methods can be utilized for a tactical or strategic interdiction campaign, Dr. Mark argues their success will depend on the specific conditions at hand.  Interdiction by attrition, for example, is best utilized on the tactical scale, as it is rarely possible to destroy more than a small portion of an enemy's soldiers and matériel at any one time.  Destroying 100 supply trucks when an enemy force may have thousands - and the trucks can be easily replaced - will represent only a minor loss on a strategic scale, but if those trucks were the only ones available to respond to a specific battle their loss could be pivotal to its outcome.  Likewise, successful interdiction by blockage is even more constrained by the existence of terrain features (i.e. bridges, tunnels, etc.) upon which an enemy is dependent, and the fact that these features are often repairable or can be avoided.  Destroying a bridge at the right time, if it prevents enemy reinforcements from arriving for even just a little while, might have an effect on the outcome of a battle, but on the strategic scale the enemy will be able to replace it or find an alternate route fairly shortly.  In this regard, creating systemic inefficiencies in the enemy's logistical system (by using a combination of attrition and blockage on the tactical scale) has been the most successful form of strategic interdiction.  An enemy that is forced to take a more circuitous route or rely on a less efficient means of transportation can, over time, find themselves falling short of their needs and so be defeated for lack of adequate supplies.

Dr. Mark also identified eight conditions that affect the outcome of interdiction campaigns, the first three of which he regards as being absolutely necessary for a successful interdiction.  The other five are contributory in that, while not defining all successful campaigns, at least one of the conditions was present.
Air Superiority: Defined as largely unimpeded access to an enemy's airspace, air superiority is vital to a successful interdiction campaign.  No interdiction campaign has succeeded where the interdictor had to fight for air superiority at the same time.
Intelligence: Having sufficient intelligence of an enemy's disposition is important not only for knowing what to attack, but when and in what manner to attack them.  Knowing, for example, not only an enemy's supply routes but their transportation schedule can be the difference between a successful or failed campaign.  This intelligence must be constantly updated as the enemy will invariably change their methods to evade interdiction.
Identifiability: If a target cannot be identified, it cannot be interdicted.  This condition refers not only to the inherent nature of the target, but the surrounding environment and the level of technology involved.  A convoy of ships at sea is easier to identify than a convoy of trucks traveling under a jungle canopy, but both would be harder to identify and attack at night if the interdictor does not possess night vision.
Sustained Pressure: Because the targets of an interdiction campaign are often replaceable or repairable, an interdictor must apply consistent pressure on their enemy to prevent them from doing so.  While more of a contributory condition during tactical interdiction operations, sustained pressure has been necessary for strategic campaigns to succeed.
Concentration: The fewer conveyances, routes or depots an enemy possesses, the easier it is to interdict them.  Comparing a small convoy of large ships to a fleet of thousands of small trucks, the destruction of any one of those ships would represent a greater loss to the enemy than the destruction of any one of the trucks.
Channelization: The fewer supply routes an enemy possesses, the greater will be their loss if any of them are severed.  This includes the existence of any choke points, whether natural or artificial, that an interdictor can take advantage of.  Certain means of conveyance are more subject to channelization than others (i.e. railroads).
High Rate of Consumption: Whether due to heavy combat or extensive movement, an enemy that is forced to consume supplies at a much higher rate is more susceptible to interdiction than if their consumption rate is low.  This prevents them from building up a stockpile of supplies, and they have less flexibility in using an inefficient method of resupply.
Logistical Constriction: If an enemy's logistical network has less inherent capacity relative to its demands, it can be harder to compensate for damage inflicted upon it.  In this way, even if the enemy has a low rate of supply consumption, constricting their logistic network sufficiently can still create supply shortfalls.

History

World War II

Korean War

Vietnam War

Iran-Iraq War
Both the Iranian Air Force (IIAF) and the Iraqi Air Force (IQAF) made concerted efforts during the early days of the Iran-Iraq War to interdict the other side. For both sides this largely amounted to engaging in armed reconnaissance and attacking targets of opportunity, with few attacks on pre-planned targets.  The IIAF did have the advantage of having superior munitions and tactical reconnaissance - possessing a squadron of RF-4E Phantoms and pre-revolution targeting intelligence - but their efforts largely mirrored that of the IQAF.

The IQAF's interdiction efforts peaked during the first 45 days of the war, but later declined to more sporadic missions, increasing in conjunction with major offensives.  Interdiction by the IIAF was more sustained through late 1980 but after mid-January 1981 also declined.  While both sides caused considerable damage on the other, with the Iranians arguably achieving more, neither interdiction effort was particularly effective nor did they play a factor in the outcome of the war.  Both sides pulled back their air forces to avoid mounting losses and with the reasoning that, while they might not play a role in winning the war, they could still be used to avoid defeat.

Operation Desert Storm

21st Century

See also
 Blockade
 No-drive zone
 Ground attack aircraft
 Interdictor

References

Bibliography

External links
Air Interdiction, by Clifford Krieger.  Aerospace Power Journal, Spring 1989.
DOD dictionary definition of air interdiction.

Interdiction